Kienzl is a surname. Notable people with the surname include: 

Fritz Kienzl (born 1924), Austrian luger 
Karla Kienzl (1922–2018), Austrian luger
Mario Kienzl (born 1983), Austrian footballer
Wilhelm Kienzl (1857–1941), Austrian composer

See also
Kienzle